Diax is a series of 35mm viewfinder and rangefinder cameras made from 1947 to 1957 by the German company Walter Voss, based in Ulm. The Diax camera was the brainchild of Walter Voss who registered the name Diax in 1945, established Walter Voss Photokamera-Fabrikation & Feinmechanik in 1946 and  began producing Diax cameras in 1947. Over ten years in business Voss company produced and sold around  Diax cameras and employed at maximum 64 people.

A characteristic model was the Diax Ia for interchangeable lenses, with 3 different viewfinders in the top, each in a different color: blue for 35mm lenses, yellow for 85 or 90mm lenses and neutral for 45 or 50 mm lenses. The Diax II, Diax IIa and Diaxette models were rangefinder cameras. The b models were like the a models, but with a rapid film advance lever. The Diax system also included 10 lens types covering 6 focal lengths with a common filter thread size of 40.5mm.

External links
 Diax website by Peter Geisler (author of the book about Diax) (English)
 Diax website by Leif Johansen (Danish)
 Diax Ia page at dirapon website (French)

References

Rangefinder cameras